Charles Genty (17 June 1876, Jargeau, Loiret - 11 January 1956, Paris, France) was a French painter, illustrator, and caricaturist.

References

1876 births
1956 deaths
French painters
French caricaturists
French illustrators
People from Loiret